Lowe's gerbil (Dipodillus lowei) is distributed mainly in Sudan; Jebel Marra.  Less than 250 individuals of this species are thought to persist in the wild.

References

  Database entry includes a brief justification of why this species is listed as data deficient
Musser, G. G. and M. D. Carleton. 2005. Superfamily Muroidea. pp. 894–1531 in Mammal Species of the World a Taxonomic and Geographic Reference. D. E. Wilson and D. M. Reeder eds. Johns Hopkins University Press, Baltimore.

Endemic fauna of Sudan
Dipodillus
Rodents of Africa
Mammals described in 1923
Taxa named by Oldfield Thomas
Taxa named by Martin Hinton
Taxobox binomials not recognized by IUCN